Philaretos Brachamios  (Armenian: Փիլարտոս Վարաժնունի, Pilartos Varajnuni) or Vahram Varajnuni was a distinguished Byzantine general and warlord of Armenian heritage, and for a time was a usurper against emperor Michael VII. Philaretos is attested on seals as taxiarches (commander of an infantry regiment), as well as protospatharios and topoteretes (deputy commander) of the Tagmata of Cappadocia, then as magistros and doux (duke), and finally as kouropalates and doux.

Career 

Philaretos is described by Michael the Syrian as having a "tough and robust character" while Matthew of Edessa saw him as a "lawless and most evil prince". Philaretos held a high command in the army of Romanus IV Diogenes. In 1069 he was given the command of the main Byzantine army that was protecting the frontier of Mesopotamia while Romanus participated in the siege of Akhlat. He was defeated by the Seljuk Turks who advanced deep into Cappadocia and Lycaonia and plundered at will before rapidly retreating with their spoils. He was present at the Battle of Manzikert in 1071, where he commanded a division of Romanus' army, and remained at the head of a considerable body of troops after the disaster.

In the aftermath of the battle, he commanded the forces of the fortress Romanopolis, and on Romanus' death he assumed the title of Emperor. As the only remaining Byzantine general in the southeast he established a quasi-autonomous realm in the neighbourhood of Germanicia, which stretched from Cilicia to Edessa. The core of his army was composed of 8,000 "Franks" (Normans) under Raimbaud. In 1078, at the beginning of the rule of Nikephoros III Botaneiates, he agreed to abandon his imperial claims on condition that Botaneiates appoint him as the duke of Antioch, which included Edessa. Several seals testify him as megas domestikos and protokouropalates, then sebastos, then even protosebastos.

He retained his dukedom until the Turks began to press heavily upon him. In December 1084, he lost Antioch to Suleiman I, Sultan of Rum. In 1087, Edessa fell to Malik Shah and Philaretos escaped back to the fortress of Germanikeia; however, some sources indicate that he died in 1086. He was the last well-known Domestic of the Schools of the East. His sons handed Germanikeia to the First Crusade in 1098.

See also
Armenian Kingdom of Cilicia

References
 Chronicles of Matthew of Edessa, translation by A. Dostourian, Armenia and the Crusades, 10th to 12th Centuries. The Chronicle of Matthew of Edessa (Lanham, MD-London, 1993)
 Dadoyan, Seta B. The Armenians in the Medieval Islamic World: Armenian Realpolitik in the Islamic World and Diverging Paradigms: Case of Cilicia Eleventh to Fourteenth Centuries. Transaction Publishers, 2013.
 Finlay, George. History of the Byzantine and Greek Empires from 1057 - 1453, volume 2, William Blackwood & Sons, 1854.
 Gravett, Christopher, and Nicolle, David. The Normans: Warrior Knights and their Castles. Osprey Publishing: Oxford, 2006.
 C. J. Yarnley. "Philaretos: Armenian Bandit or Byzantine General", in Revue des Études Arméniennes, volume 9 (Paris 1972), pp. 331–353.

Notes

External links
Project Beauceant: Chronicle of events between 1050 and 1350

1080s deaths
Byzantine people of Armenian descent
Byzantine generals
Byzantine usurpers
Medieval Armenian generals
11th-century Byzantine people
Byzantine people of the Byzantine–Seljuk wars
Byzantine governors of Antioch
Year of birth unknown
Domestics of the Schools
11th-century Armenian people
Grand Domestics
Magistroi
Varazhnuni family
Protosebastoi
Protospatharioi